Sukkur City Tehsil is an administrative subdivision (tehsil) of Sukkur District in the Sindh province of Pakistan, the city of Sukkur is the capital.

Administration
Sukkur City Taluka is administratively subdivided into 11 Union Councils. New Sukkur Taluka administratively subdivided into 9 Union Councils.

References

Talukas of Sindh
Sukkur District